Departure of a Grand Old Man is a 1912 Russian silent film about the last days of author Leo Tolstoy. The film was directed by Yakov Protazanov and Elizaveta Thiman, and was actress Olga Petrova's first film.

Plot
The film depicts a group of peasants who come to the home of Leo Tolstoy to ask for land. We see the old sage attempting to help the peasants while his wife Sofia Andreevna is counting money and quarreling.

Overwhelmed, Tolstoy is driven to the edge of suicide. It ends with Tolstoy on his death bed being visited by Jesus. The film was banned because of the negative portrayal of Tolstoy's wife Sofia Tolstaya, who threatened to sue the filmmakers for libel.

Cast
 Olga Petrova as Sofia Tolstaya
 Vladimir Shaternikov as Leo Tolstoy
 Leo Tolstoy as himself (from documentary footage filmed by A. Drankov)
 Mikhail Tamarov as Vladimir Chertkov
 Elizaveta Thiman as Alexandra Lvovna Tolstaya

References

Citations
Kenez, Peter, Cinema and Soviet Society: 1917-1953 (Cambridge: Cambridge University Press, 1992)

External links

1912 films
Russian silent films
Russian black-and-white films
Films of the Russian Empire
Films directed by Yakov Protazanov
Works about Leo Tolstoy
Cultural depictions of Leo Tolstoy